The Handbook of Automated Reasoning (2128 pages) is a collection of survey articles on the field of automated reasoning. Published in June 2001 by MIT Press, it is edited by John Alan Robinson and Andrei Voronkov. Volume 1 describes methods for classical logic, first-order logic with equality and other theories, and induction. Volume 2 covers higher-order, non-classical and other kinds of logic.

Index

Volume 1 
History

Classical Logic

Equality and Other Theories

Induction

Volume 2 
Higher-Order Logic and Logical Frameworks

Nonclassical Logics

Decidable Classes and Model Building

Implementation

External links
 MIT press page

2001 non-fiction books
Handbooks and manuals
Logic books
Computer science books
Automated reasoning